The Syriac Catholic Patriarch of Antioch is the head of the Syriac Catholic Church. According to tradition, the patriarchate of Antioch was established by Saint Peter in the 1st century AD, but split into two separate lines of patriarchs after the deposition of Patriarch Severus of Antioch in 518 over the issue of the Council of Chalcedon of 451. The non-Chalcedonian supporters of Severus went on to form what is now known as the Syriac Orthodox Church, whilst the Chalcedonians developed the church now known as the Greek Orthodox Church of Antioch.

The office was established with the election of Ignatius Andrew Akijan in 1662 as patriarch of Antioch, thereby creating a separate line of patriarchs in full communion with the Catholic Church, in opposition to the Syriac Orthodox Church. Despite initial success, after the death of Ignatius Gregory Peter VI Shahbaddin in 1701 or 1702, most Syriac Catholics returned to the Syriac Orthodox Church, and the office lay vacant until the election of Ignatius Michael III Jarweh in 1782, from which a permanent line of Syriac Catholic patriarchs sprang.

The following is a list of all the incumbents of the office of Syriac Catholic Patriarch of Antioch.

List of patriarchs

Patriarchs of Antioch before 512

Syriac patriarchs from 512 to 1662

Syriac Catholic patriarchs from 1662 to present
Unless otherwise stated, all information is from the Gorgias Encyclopedic Dictionary of the Syriac Heritage, and the list provided in The Syriac World, as noted in the bibliography below.

Ignatius Andrew Akijan (1662–1677/1678)
Ignatius Gregory Peter VI Shahbaddin (1678–1701/1702)
Isaac Basilios Joubeir
vacant (1701/1702–1782)
Ignatius Michael III Jarweh (1782–1800)
vacant (1800–1802)
Ignatius Michael IV Daher (1802–1810)
vacant (1810–1814)
Ignatius Simon II Hindi Zora (1814–1818)
vacant (1818–1820)
Ignatius Peter VII Jarweh (1820–1851)
vacant (1851–1852/1853)
Ignatius Antony I Samheri (1852/1853–1864)
vacant (1864–1866)
Ignatius Philip I Arkus (1866–1874)
Ignatius George V Shelhot (1874–1891)
vacant (1891–1893)
Ignatius Behnam II Benni (1893–1897)
Ignatius Ephrem II Rahmani (1898–1929)
Ignatius Gabriel I Tappouni (1929–1968)
Ignatius Antony II Hayyek (1968–1998)
Ignatius Moses I Daoud (1998–2001)
Ignatius Peter VIII Abdalahad (2001–2008)
Ignatius Joseph III Yonan (2009–present)

See also
 Council of Catholic Patriarchs of the East

References
Notes

Citations

Bibliography

Antioch, Syr
Lists of patriarchs
 
Turkey religion-related lists
Syria religion-related lists
Iraq religion-related lists
Lebanon religion-related lists